Queen Ingyeong (인경왕후 김씨; 25 October 1661 − 16 December 1680), of the Gwangsan Kim clan, was a posthumous name bestowed to the wife and first queen consort of Yi Sun, King Sukjong, the 19th Joseon monarch. She was queen consort of Joseon from 1674 until her death in 1680.

Biography
The future queen was born on 25 October 1661 during the reign of King Hyeonjong. Her name was Kim Ok-hye (김옥혜, 金玉惠).

Her father was Kim Man-gi and her mother was member of the Cheongju Han clan. Kim Jang-saeng is her great-great grandfather and Kim Jib is her great-granduncle through her father. She is also a first cousin thrice removed of Queen Inseon as well as a first cousin once removed of Queen Hyosun.

She was married at the age of 10 to Hyeonjong's only son, Crown Prince Myeongbo, entitling her as crown princess consort (왕세자빈, wangsejabin). In 1674, her husband ascended to the throne as the 19th Joseon monarch (temple name: Sukjong) and she became queen consort.

In 1677, she gave birth to a daughter who eventually died a year later on 13 March 1678. In 1679, the Queen gave birth to another daughter but she died prematurely a day later. In the summer of 1680, she had been pregnant, but due to an incident she had a miscarriage.

On 8 December 1680, age 19, she showed signs of smallpox and died 8 days later on December 16 in Gyeongdeok Palace (now known as Gyeonghui Palace). She is buried in Ikreung (익릉) in Gyeonggi province.

Family
 Great-Great-Great-Great-Great-Grandfather
 Kim Jong-yun (김종윤, 金宗胤)
 Great-Great-Great-Great-Grandfather 
 Kim Ho (김호, 金鎬)
 Great-Great-Great-Great-Grandmother
 Lady Lee of the Jeonui Lee clan (전의 이씨)
 Great-Great-Great-Grandfather 
 Kim Gye-hui (김계휘, 金繼輝) (1526 - 1582)
 Great-Great-Great-Grandmother 
 Lady Shin of the Pyeongsan Shin clan (정부인 평산 신씨, 貞夫人 平山申氏) (1533 - 1618)
 Great-Great-Grandfather 
 Kim Jang-saeng (김장생, 金長生) (8 August 1548 - 3 August 1631)
 Great-Great-Grandmother
 Lady Jo of the Changnyeong Jo clan (증 정경부인 창녕 조씨, 贈 貞敬夫人 昌寧 曺氏) (1551 - 1586); Kim Jang-saeng’s first wife
 Great-Grandfather
 Kim Ban (김반, 金槃) (1580 - 1640)
 Great-Grandmother 
 Lady Seo of the Yeonsan Seo clan (증 정경부인 연산 서씨, 贈 貞敬夫人 連山 徐氏) (1590 - 1637); Kim Ban’s second wife
 Grandfather 
 Kim Ik-gyeom (김익겸, 金益兼) (1614 - 16 February 1637)
 Grandmother
 Lady Yun of the Haepyeong Yun clan (정경부인 해평 윤씨, 貞敬夫人 海平 尹氏) (1617 - 1689)
 Father
 Kim Man-Gi (김만기,  金萬基) (1633 - 15 March 1687)
 Uncle - Kim Man-jung (김만중, 金萬重) (6 March 1637 - 14 June 1692)
 Aunt - Lady Yi of the Yeonan Yi clan (정경부인 연안 이씨, 貞敬夫人 延安 李氏) (1639 - 1705)
 Cousin - Kim Jin-hwa (김진화, 金鎭華) (1655 - 1694)
 Cousin - Lady Kim of the Gwangsan Kim clan (정경부인 광산 김씨, 貞敬夫人 光山 金氏) (1657 - 1736)
 Mother
 Internal Princess Consort Seowon of the Cheongju Han clan (서원부부인 청주 한씨, 西原府夫人 淸州 韓氏) (1634 - 1720)
 Grandfather − Han Yu-ryang (1603 – 1656) (한유량, 韓有良)
Grandmother - Lady Yi of the Deoksu Yi clan (덕수 이씨, 德水 李氏) (1605 - 1684)
 Siblings
 Older brother - Kim Jin-gu (김진구, 金鎭龜) (1651 - 1704)
 Sister-in-law - Lady Yi of the Hansan Yi clan  (정경부인 한산 이씨, 貞敬夫人 韓山 李氏) (1651 - 1721)
 Nephew - Kim Chun-taek (김춘택, 金春澤) (1670 - 1717)
 Niece-in-law - Lady Yi of the Wansan Yi clan (완산 이씨, 完山 李氏)
 Grandnephew - Kim Deok-jae (김덕재, 金德材)
 Great-Grandnephew - Kim Du-chu (김두추, 金斗秋)
 Great-Grandniece - Lady Kim of the Gwangsan Kim clan 
 Great Grandnephew-in-law - Yi Geuk-gwang (이극광)
 Great-Grandniece - Lady Kim of the Gwangsan Kim clan
 Great Grandnephew-in-law - Yi Hong-ji (이홍지)
 Grandniece - Lady Kim of the Gwangsan Kim clan 
 Grandnephew-in-law - Song Jeong-sang (송정상)
 Grandniece - Lady Kim of the Gwangsan Kim clan
 Grandnephew-in-law - Heo Woo-ae (허우에)
 Grandniece - Lady Kim of the Gwangsan Kim clan
 Grandnephew-in-law - Song Jin-sang (송진상)
 Older brother - Kim Jin-gyu (김진규, 金鎭圭) (1658 - 1716)
 Sister-in-law - Lady Yi of the Deoksu Yi clan (정경부인 덕수 이씨, 貞敬夫人 德水 李氏) (1657 - 1701)
 Sister-in-law - Lady Jeong of the Yeonil Jeong clan (정경부인 연일 정씨, 貞敬夫人 延日 鄭氏) (1691 - 1718)
 Nephew - Kim Yeon-taek (김연택, 星延澤)
 Nephew - Kim Yang-taek (김양택, 金陽澤) (1712 - 1776)
 Younger brother - Kim Jin-seo (김진서, 金鎭瑞) (1663 - 1712)
 Sister-in-law - Lady Jang of the Deoksu Jang clan (덕수 장씨, 德水 張氏)
 Younger brother - Kim Jin-bu (김진부, 金鎭符) (1676 - 1693)
 Younger sister - Kim Han-hye (김한혜, 金漢惠), Lady Kim of the Gwangsan Kim clan 
 Brother-in-law - Jeong Eon-jin (정언진)
 Younger sister - Kim Bok-hye (김복혜, 金福惠), Lady Kim of the Gwangsan Kim clan 
 Brother-in-law - Yi Ju-shin (이주신, 李舟臣) of the Yeonan Yi clan (연안 이씨)
 Nephew - Yi Cheon-bo (이천보, 李天輔) (1698 - 1761)
 Niece-in-law - Lady Song of the Eunjin Song clan (은진 송씨); daughter of Song Sang-yu (송상유)
 Grandnephew - Yi Mun-won (이문원, 李文源)
 Grandniece-in-law - Lady Sim of the Cheongsong Sim clan (청송 심씨)
 Great-Grandnephew - Sim Jon-su (이존수, 李存秀) (5 June 1772 -  14 October 1829)
 Grandniece - Lady Yi of the Yeonan Yi clan 
 Grandnephew-in-law - Jo Gyeong (조경, 趙絅)
 Grandniece - Lady Yi of the Yeonan Yi clan 
 Grandnephew-in-law - Oh Jae-sun (오재순, 吳載純) (1727 - 1792)
 Great-Grandnephew - Oh Hui-sang (오희상, 吳煕常) (1763 - 1833)
 Great-Grandnephew - Oh Yeon-sang (오연상, 吳淵常) (1765 - 1821)
 Grandniece - Lady Yi of the Yeonan Yi clan
 Grandnephew-in-law - Seo Yu-bang (서유방, 徐有防)
 Niece - Lady Yi of the Yeonan Yi clan 
 Nephew-in-law - Sim Sa-ju (심사주, 沈師周)
 Husband − Yi Sun, King Sukjong (7 October 1661 – 12 July 1720) (조선 숙종)
 Unnamed daughter (27 April 1677 – 13 March 1678)
 Unnamed daughter (23 October 1679 – 24 October 1679)
 Unnamed child (22 July 1680); miscarriage

Full posthumous name 
Queen Ingyeong, Gwangryeol Hyojang Myeonghyeon Seonmok Hyeseong Sunui
광렬효장명현선목혜성순의인경왕후
 光烈孝莊明顯宣穆惠聖純懿仁敬王后

In popular culture
Portrayed by Ju Jeung-ryu in the 1961 film Jang Hui-bin.
Portrayed by Park Soon Chun in the 1988 MBC TV series 500 Years of Joseon:Queen In Hyeon.
Portrayed by Sa Mi Ja and Jang Hye Sook in the 1995 SBS TV series Jang Hee Bin.
Portrayed by Kim Ha-eun in the 2013 SBS TV series Jang Ok-jung, Living by Love.

Notes

External links
 https://thetalkingcupboard.com/joseon/royal-ladies-of-joseon-dynasty/

1661 births
1680 deaths
Royal consorts of the Joseon dynasty
Korean queens consort
17th-century Korean women